O Chum 2 Hydropower Dam is located on O Chum River, in Banlung, Ratanakiri Province, Cambodia. O Chum 2, commissioned in 1993, is a 1 MW mini-hydropower plant located in the north-east of Ratanakiri province. It is owned and operated by the Cambodian government and has an estimated annual generation output of between 2.2-2.5 GWh.

The dam has the following characteristics:
installed capacity 
  annually
seasonal storage hydropower
head 
height 
length 
active storage 
catchment area .

See also

 Mekong
 Mekong River Commission
 O Chum River

References

External links

Dams completed in 1992
Energy infrastructure completed in 1992
Dams in Cambodia
Hydroelectric power stations in Cambodia
Buildings and structures in Ratanakiri province